Karel Uher (born 3 July 1983 in Prague) is a Czech male curler.

At the national level, he is a three-time Czech male champion curler (2009, 2010, 2011).

Teams

Men's

Mixed

Personal life
He started curling in 1993 at the age of 10.

References

External links

Living people
1983 births
Sportspeople from Prague
Czech male curlers
Czech curling champions